Belomicrus is a genus of insects belonging to the family Crabronidae.

The species of this genus are found in Europe, Africa and Northern America.

Species:
 Belomicrus affinis Gussakovskij, 1952 
 Belomicrus albosectus Kazenas & Antropov, 1994

References

Crabronidae
Hymenoptera genera